Lights Creek is a  long stream in Plumas County, California and is a tributary of Indian Creek, part of the Feather River watershed. 

The creek begins in the Diamond Mountains, near the border of Plumas and Lassen County. It flows in a south-southwesterly direction through a high mountain valley in the Plumas National Forest. About two-thirds of the way down from its source, it enters the North Arm of Indian Valley, which is used for farming and ranching. It joins Indian Creek on the right bank about a mile (1.6 km) north of Taylorsville.

See also
List of rivers of California

References

Rivers of Plumas County, California